Promalactis serpenticapitata is a moth of the family Oecophoridae. It is found in Fujian, Jiangxi and Zhejiang provinces of China.

The wingspan is about 10.5–13 mm. The basal three-fifths of the forewings are ochreous brown, the distal two-fifths are ochreous yellow. The markings are silvery white or white, edged with dense black scales. The hindwings and cilia are dark grey.

Etymology
The specific name is derived from the Latin prefix serpent- (meaning snakelike) and the adjective capitatus (meaning having a head) and refers to the small, snake head shaped subapical process on the ventral surface of the gnathos.

References

Moths described in 2013
Oecophorinae
Insects of China